Erythrandra is a genus of true flies in the family Sarcophagidae.

Species
E. picipes Brauer & von Bergenstamm, 1891
E. distincta (Townsend, 1892)

References 

Sarcophagidae
Schizophora genera